Gabriel Antonio Lunetta (born 10 August 1996) is an Italian football player. He also holds French citizenship. He plays for  club Südtirol, on loan from Croatian club Rijeka.

Club career

Atalanta

Loan to Gubbio 
On 14 July 2016, Lunetta was loaned to Serie C club Gubbio on a season-long loan deal. On 13 September he made his professional debut in Serie C for Gubbio in a 3–1 home defeat against Sambenedettese, he was replaced by Leonardo Candellone in the 46th minute. On 30 April 2017 he played his second match for the club as a substitute replacing Daniele Casiraghi in the 82nd minute of a 3–0 away defeat against Bassano Virtus. On 13 May he made his third appearance, again as a substitute, replacing Massimo Conti in the 68th minute of a 3–2 home win over Sambenedettese in the first round of play-off. Lunetta ended his season-long loan to Gubbio with only this 3 appearances.

Loan to Renate 
On 11 July 2017, Lunetta was signed by Serie C side Renate on a season-long loan deal. On 30 July, Lunetta made his debut for Renate in a 3–1 home win over Siracusa in the first round of Coppa Italia, he scored his first goal in the 57th minute and he was replaced by Guido Gòmez in the 64th minute. On 27 August, Lunetta made his Serie C debut for Renate in a 3–0 home win over Padova, he was replaced by Francesco Finocchio in the 71st minute. On 16 September, Lunetta scored his first goal in Serie C in the third minute of a 3–0 away win over Modena. On 24 September he played his first entire match for Renate, a 1–0 home win over Reggiana. On 8 November he scored his second goal in the 12th minute of a 1–1 away draw against Vicenza.  Lunetta ended his loan to Renate with 31 appearances, 5 goals and 7 assists.

Loan to Giana Erminio and Südtirol 
On 23 August 2018, Lunetta was loaned to Serie C club Giana Erminio on a season-long loan deal. On 16 September he made his debut for Giana Erminio in Serie C as a substitute replacing Daniele Rocco in the 60th minute of a 0–0 away draw against Vicenza Virtus. One week later, on 23 September, he played his first match as a starter in a 2–1 home defeat against Imolese, he was replaced by Mbia Seck in the 46th minute. On 7 October he scored his first goal for Giana Erminio in the 20th minute of a 2–2 home draw against Rimini. On 1 December he played his first entire match for the team, a 4–2 home defeat against FeralpiSalò. In January 2019 his loan was interrupted and he left Giana Erminio with 19 appearances, 1 goal and 2 assists.

On 29 January 2019, Lunetta was signed by Südtirol on a 6-month loan deal. On 2 February he made his debut as a substitute replacing Alessandro Fabbri in the 90th minute of a 4–2 away win over AlbinoLeffe. One week later, on 9 February, he played his first entire match for the team, a 2–0 home win over Fermana. One more week later, on 16 February he scored twice in a 4–0 home win over Gubbio. Lunetta ended his 6-month loan to Südtirol with 15 appearances, 4 goals and 1 assist.

Loan to Reggio Audace 
On 14 August 2019, Lunetta was loaned to newly promoted Serie C side Reggio Audace on a season-long loan deal. Ten days later, on 24 August, he made his debut for the club in Serie C as a substitute replacing Mattia Marchi in the 85th minute and he scored his first goal in the 93rd minute of a 4–1 home win over FeralpiSalò. Eight days later, on 1 September, he scored his second goal, again as a substitute, in the 81st minute of a 2–1 away win over Ravenna. On 15 September, Lunetta played his first match as a starter for the club, a 3–0 away win over Südtirol, he was replaced by Riccardo Martinelli in the 72nd minute. Lunetta ended his season-long loan with 17 appearances, 2 goals and 2 assist and he also helped the club to reach the promotion in Serie B.

On 31 August 2020 his loan was extended for another season.

Loan to Alessandria 
On 16 July 2021, he joined Alessandria on a season-long loan.

Rijeka 
On 31 August 2022, Lunetta signed with Rijeka in Croatia.

Return to Südtirol
On 12 January 2023, Lunetta returned to Südtirol on loan until the end of the season. Südtirol holds an obligation to purchase his rights permanently if the club avoids relegation from Serie B.

Career statistics

Club

References

External links
 

1996 births
Footballers from Milan
French people of Italian descent
Living people
Italian footballers
Association football forwards
A.S. Gubbio 1910 players
A.C. Renate players
F.C. Südtirol players
A.C. Reggiana 1919 players
U.S. Alessandria Calcio 1912 players
HNK Rijeka players
Serie B players
Serie C players
Croatian Football League players
Italian expatriate footballers
Expatriate footballers in Croatia
Italian expatriate sportspeople in Croatia